The National Museum of World War II Aviation is an aviation museum located at Colorado Springs Airport in Colorado Springs, Colorado.

History 
The origins of the museum date to the founding of WestPac Restorations at Rialto Municipal Airport in Rialto, California in 1997 by Bill Klaers and Alan Wojciak. Due to the planned closure of the airport in 2014, Jim Fry convinced the owners to move the business to Colorado Springs Airport, where he had built three hangars in 2006. There the National Museum of World War II Aviation was established. It opened to the public six years later in October 2012.

In 2014, the museum received two grants totaling $6 million to build a  "Aviation Hall". In 2016, Jim Slattery loaned 15 aircraft to the museum. In early 2018, it received an official "national museum" designation from the United States Congress. The museum began construction on a new  hangar in November 2018. The museum received donations of a Lockheed P-38 Lightning and Stinson V-77 Reliant in late 2019.

Exhibits 
The museum has a series of exhibits that trace the history of the United States' involvement in World War II.

Collection

On display 

 Aero L-39 Albatross
 Beechcraft E18S
 Beechcraft T-34B Mentor
 Brewster F3A Corsair
 Canadian Vickers PBV-1A Canso
 Cessna A-37 Dragonfly
 Cessna L-19 Bird Dog
 Douglas AD-5 Skyraider
 Douglas SBD-4 Dauntless
 Fairchild PT-19
 Grumman F3F
 Grumman F7F-3 Tigercat
 Grumman F7F-3 Tigercat
 Grumman G-44 Widgeon
 Grumman HU-16 Albatross
 General Motors TBM Avenger
 General Motors TBM Avenger
 Howard DGA-15
 Lockheed P-38 Lightning
 North American T-6 Texan
 North American T-28 Trojan
 North American TB-25N Mitchell
 Republic P-47D Thunderbolt
 Stinson L-5B Sentinel
 Stinson V77 Reliant
 Vought F4U Corsair
 Waco JYM

Under restoration 

 Beechcraft Model 18
 Curtiss SB2C Helldiver
 Fairchild PT-19
 Grumman F6F Hellcat
 Grumman F6F Hellcat
 Lockheed P-38 Lightning
 Naval Aircraft Factory N3N
 North American B-25 Mitchell
 Republic P-47 Thunderbolt
 Vought F4U-4 Corsair
 Vultee SNV-1

Land vehicles 
In addition to its aircraft, the museum also maintains a collection of land vehicles:

 Chevrolet Crash Truck
 Ford GPW
 White M2A1
 White M3A1

References

External links 

 
 Westpac Restorations (Archived)

2008 establishments in Colorado
Aerospace museums in Colorado
Museums in El Paso County, Colorado
Museums established in 2008
Military and war museums in Colorado